Rebbe is Yiddish word derived from the Hebrew word rabbi, which means "master, teacher, or mentor".

Rebbe may also refer to:
 
Menachem Mendel Schneerson, due to his public prominence, called "The Rebbe"
Rebbe (book), a biography of Schneerson
Tyler Rebbe, drummer in the rock band Pulley

See also

Rabbi (disambiguation)